Mamey may refer to:

Plants and fruits
 Magnolia guatemalensis, in the family Magnoliaceae, known as "mamey"
 Mammea americana, "yellow mamey", in the family Calophyllaceae
 Pouteria sapota, "red mamey", in the family Sapotaceae

Geography
Mamey, Aguada, Puerto Rico, a barrio
Mamey, Guaynabo, Puerto Rico, a barrio
Mamey, Gurabo, Puerto Rico, a barrio
Mamey, Juncos, Puerto Rico, a barrio
Mamey, Patillas, Puerto Rico, a barrio
Mamey, Meurthe-et-Moselle, France

See also
El Mamey Formation, a geologic formation in the Dominican Republic
Mameyes, a community within the limits of barrio Portugués Urbano, Puerto Rico
Mameyes Landslide, a disaster in the Puerto Rico community